Murali G is an Indian cinematographer who works mainly in Tamil cinema. An alumnus of the Film and Television Institute of India (FTII), Pune, he won the National Film Award for Best Non-Feature Film Cinematography in 2011.

Early life
Murali was born and brought up in the village near Uthangarai, Krishnagiri district, Tamil Nadu. He did his schooling in Uthangarai and upon completion of his school, he was engaged as a social worker and got involved with the student wing of Communist party of India for more than a year before joining a music college. He enrolled himself at the Government Arts College, Kumbakonam for a degree in fine arts and later joined the Film and Television Institute of India, Pune, to do a course in motion picture photography. He assisted Rajeev Ravi in Anurag Kashyap's Dev.D (2009), before making his feature film debut with the Andala Rakshasi (2012). His subsequent films: Madras (2014), Kabali (2016), Kaala (2018), and Sarpatta Parambarai (2021), were all directed by Pa. Ranjith.

Filmography

References

 

 
People from Krishnagiri district
Film and Television Institute of India alumni
Tamil film cinematographers
Telugu film cinematographers
Year of birth missing (living people)
Living people
Cinematographers from Tamil Nadu
National Film Award (India) winners